Kuzma (Kozma) Minin (full name Kuzma Minich Zakhariev-Sukhoruky,  born late 1570s - died 1616) was a Russian merchant from Nizhny Novgorod, Russia, who, together with Prince Dmitry Pozharsky, became a national hero for his role in defending the country against the Polish invasion in the early 17th century.<ref name=hero1>"Minin Kusma (?-1616) was a leader of the national liberating struggle of Russian people against the Polish invaders, one of the leaders of the second volunteer corps (1611–12) and a national hero.""Kuzma Minin " at "History of Yaroslavl" by Yaroslavl State University</ref>"Dmitri Pozharski and Kuzma Minin are national heroes for their part in defending the Russian state from Polish interventionists in the early 17th century"editorial footnote in John Freedman, "The Major Plays of Nikolai Erdman", p. 112, Routledge (UK), 1995, 

A native of Balakhna, Minin was a prosperous butcher (meat trader) in the city of Nizhny Novgorod. When the popular patriotic movement to organize volunteer corps in his home city was formed, the merchants chose Minin, a trusted and respected member of the guild, to oversee the handling of the public funds donated by them to raise and equip the Second Volunteer Army (Второе народное ополчение).

The army led by prince Dmitry Pozharsky was credited with clearing the Moscow Kremlin of Polish forces on November 1, 1612. Minin distinguished himself as a skilled commander and was made a nobleman and member of the Boyar Duma under the newly elected Tsar Michael Romanov. He died in 1616 and was interred in the Archangel Cathedral of Nizhny Novgorod. A central square of that city is named after him and Prince Pozharsky.

Family

Minin had a single son, Nefed. After Minin's death his property rights passed to his widow, Tatyana Semyonovna, and his son. A royal decree was issued on July 5, 1616, confirming the family's possession of an estate in the Nizhny Novgorod district consisting of the town of Bogorodskoye with its associated villages. Additionally, Nefed Minin owned property in the Kremlin of Nizhny Novgorod, although after the completion of his service, he lived mostly in Moscow where he worked as a government clerk. In 1625 he attended the departure of the Persian ambassador and in 1626 he is recorded as standing by the sovereign's lantern at two royal weddings. No mention is made of him in official records after 1628. Nefed died in 1632 and the lands granted to his father reverted to the crown before being passed to Prince Jacob Kudenekovich Cherkassky.

Tatyana Minin continued to live in Nizhny Novgorod. It appears that at an advanced age she took monastic vows and entered a convent – most likely the Resurrection Convent, located inside the city's Kremlin.

Historical analysis

Minin is generally well regarded by later historians such as Ivan Zabelin and Mikhail Pogodin, having gained respect for his heroic actions.

References

Inline

General
"The ancient heroes of the Russian people's militia" in "Kommersant-Den'gi", available online 
Kuzma Minin in the Brockhaus and Efron Encyclopedic Dictionary 
Minin, Kuzma in the Great Soviet Encyclopedia 

1616 deaths
Russian military leaders
Russian people of the Polish–Muscovite War (1605–1618)
Year of birth unknown
Businesspeople from Nizhny Novgorod
People from Balakhninsky District
Military personnel from Nizhny Novgorod
Butchers
17th-century Russian businesspeople